Mount Fordell is a mountain,  high, marking the south end of the Marble Hills in the Heritage Range, Antarctica. It was named by the Advisory Committee on Antarctic Names for Lieutenant William D. Fordell, U.S. Navy, a co-pilot of LC-47 aircraft, who perished in a plane crash on the Ross Ice Shelf on February 2, 1966.

See also
 Mountains in Antarctica

References 

Mountains of Ellsworth Land